Negrelos may refer to:

 Negrelos (São Mamede)
 Negrelos (São Tomé)